USAR or U.S.A.R. may refer to:

 United Speed Alliance Racing (now Rev-Oil Pro Cup Series), a car racing series in the United States
 United States Army Rangers, the elite light infantry of the United States Army
 United States Army Reserve, the reserve component forces of the United States Army
 University School of Automation & Robotics, Guru Gobind Singh Indraprastha University, Delhi, India
 Urban search and rescue, rescue operations inside structures or other confined spaces
 USA Rugby, the governing body of rugby union in the United States